The Auer (also called Mühlbach or Ziegelbach) is a river in Hesse, Germany which springs from the western edge of the Felsberg in the Hessian Odenwald between Balkhausen and Bensheim-Hochstädten. It measures 6.7 kilometers in length and is part of the Rhine river system.

Mühlbach 
The Auer has ten tributaries and flows through the Bensheim district of Hochstädten, past the Marble factory and the  through the valley Mühltal towards Bensheim-Auerbach. In the past, there were seven mills in the Mühltal powered by the Auer's water. Therefore here the brook's vernacular name is Mühlbach (mill brook). The mill in the village's center is nowadays a wine restaurant, another mill is a nursing home, and another mill is the studio and residential house of an Auerbach-based artist. The other four mills (Kadelsmühle, Wiemersmühle, Mößingersmühle and Jungmühle) are used as residential houses.

The Mühltal is bordered to the north by the Auerberg hill along with Auerbach Castle, an old castle ruin, and to the south by the federal  park Fürstenlager.

Auerbach 
In the district of Bensheim-Auerbach, the Auer is split into two parts, one above ground and the other being a subterranean channel. Because of the recurring floods in the street Bachgasse, the largest part of the Auer was channeled in the 1980s. Like at the antetype Freiburg Bächle, an ever constant part of the Auer flows openly through the Bachgasse, through the old village of Auerbach passing numerous half-timbered buildings towards the Bundesstraße 3 (Darmstädter Straße).

Ziegelbach 
After the two streams united again, the Auer crosses the Bundesstraße under ground and flows towards the Auerbach railway station. Since around 1850 there was a brick factory, also porcelain factory, the Auer is called there also Ziegelbach (brick brook).

After crossing the railway line Darmstadt-Heidelberg, the Auer reaches after approximately 1 km its mouth. It flows into the Winkelbach coming from Bensheim, which is called upstream of the Auer's mouth Lauter. The Winkelbach flows at Gernsheim into the Rhine.

The total length of the Auer from the source to the mouth is 6.7 km.

See also 
List of rivers of Hesse

References

External links 

Rivers of Hesse
Rivers of Germany